Reinhold Stecher  (22 December 1921 – 29 January 2013) was an Austrian Prelate of the Roman Catholic Church.  

Stecher was born in Innsbruck, Austria and was ordained a priest on 19 December 1947. He was appointed bishop of the Diocese of Innsbruck on 15 December 1980 and ordained bishop on 25 January 1981. He retired on 10 October 1997.

External links
Catholic-Hierarchy
Diocese of Innsbruck (German)

20th-century Roman Catholic bishops in Austria
People from Innsbruck
1921 births
2013 deaths